The 1966 Massachusetts general election was held on November 8, 1966, throughout Massachusetts. Primary elections took place on September 13.

At the federal level, Republican Edward Brooke was elected to the United States Senate over Democrat Endicott Peabody and Democrats won seven of twelve seats in the United States House of Representatives. Former Speaker of the House Joseph W. Martin Jr. was the only incumbent not re-elected, after his defeat in the Republican primary against Margaret Heckler.

In the race for Governor, incumbent Republican Governor John Volpe defeated Democratic challenger Edward J. McCormack Jr. Overall, Republicans won three of the six elected state-wide offices. Incumbents were re-elected in four races.

This was the first election in which the term of office for all state officers was extended from two to four years.

Governor

Republican John A. Volpe was re-elected over Democrat Edward J. McCormack, Jr., Socialist Labor candidate Henning A. Blomen, and Prohibition candidate John C. Hedges.

Lieutenant Governor

Lt. Governor Elliott Richardson did not run for re-election. Republican Francis W. Sargent was elected Lieutenant Governor over Democrat Joseph E. McGuire.

Republican primary

Candidates
 Francis Sargent, Commissioner of Public Works

Declined
 Elliot Richardson, incumbent Lieutenant Governor (running for Attorney General)

Results
Francis Sargent was unopposed for the nomination.

Democratic primary

Candidates
 Herbert L. Connolly, auto dealer
 Joseph E. McGuire, attorney from Worcester

Results

General election

Results
Francis W. Sargent defeated Joseph E. McGuire by 199,939 votes. It was the last general election in which the Governor and Lt. Governor were elected separately.

Attorney General

Incumbent Attorney General Edward Brooke did not run for re-election.

Republican Lt. Governor Elliot Richardson defeated former Democrat Lt. Governor Francis X. Bellotti to win the open race.

Democratic primary

Candidates
Francis X. Bellotti, former Lieutenant Governor (1963–65) and nominee for Governor in 1964
Robert DeGiacomo
Foster Furcolo, former Governor (1957–61)

Results

General election

Results

Secretary of the Commonwealth

Incumbent Secretary of the Commonwealth Kevin White, defeated Republican Raymond Trudel, Socialist Labor candidate Willy N. Hogseth, and Prohibition candidate F. Oliver Drake in the general election.

General election

Results

Treasurer and Receiver-General

Incumbent Treasurer and Receiver-General Robert Q. Crane defeated Republican Joseph Fernandes, Socialist Labor candidate Domenico DiGirolamo, and Prohibition candidate Julia Kohler in the general election.

General election

Results

Auditor

Incumbent Auditor Thaddeus M. Buczko defeated state representative James H. Kelly in the Democratic primary.

In the general election, Buczko defeated Republican John J. Buckley, Socialist Labor candidate August Johnson, and Prohibition candidate Roger I. Williams in the general election.

Democratic primary

Candidates
Thaddeus M. Buczko, incumbent Auditor
James H. Kelly, State Representative

Results

General election

Results

United States Senate

Republican Edward Brooke was elected over Democrat Endicott Peabody, Socialist Labor candidate Lawrence Gilfedder, and Prohibition candidate Mark R. Shaw.

See also
 165th Massachusetts General Court (1967–1968)

References

 
Massachusetts